John Tileston Edsall (3 November 1902 – 12 June 2002) was a protein scientist, who contributed significantly to the understanding of the hydrophobic interaction. He was an elected member of the American Academy of Arts and Sciences, the United States National Academy of Sciences, and the American Philosophical Society.

Early life

Born in Philadelphia, John Edsall moved to Boston with his family at the age of 10. He graduated from Harvard University with a degree in chemistry. At Harvard he was a good friend of the physicist Robert Oppenheimer. He wrote an account of his life and career in a review.

Protein research

Edsall worked with Edwin Cohn during
World War II to apply protein methods to blood fractionation. Subsequently, in 1943, they published a  book Proteins, Amino Acids and Peptides. 
This had a profound influence on the next generation of protein scientists. Long afterwards Edsall wrote an account of his interaction with Cohn.

He published numerous papers on protein chemistry, including work on myosin, fibrinogen, light scattering, measurement of tyrosine groups by ultraviolet spectroscopy, and carbonic anhydrase.

Advances in Protein Chemistry

In 1944 John Edsall was a founding co-editor of the journal Advances in Protein Chemistry. He was invited by the publisher Kurt Jacoby and the founding editor Tim Anson, whom he had met in 1924 in Cambridge (although they were both undergraduates at Harvard University at nearly the same time). He remained series editor up to volume 47 (1995).

The Journal of Biological Chemistry

From 1958 to 1967 Edsall was chief editor of the Journal of Biological Chemistry, years that  Irving Klotz described in the following terms:
 These years cover the period of the transition from a stodgy classical journal to a modern exciting one, reflecting the rise of molecular biological approaches.

At his retirement from the editorship Konrad Bloch published a tribute to him in the Journal.

Teaching and students
He was Professor at the Harvard University.  He inspired medical student Alexander Rich to pursue an academic career.

Historical interests

Edsall was active in preserving the history of protein science.

Personal history

John T. Edsall married Margaret Dunham of Scarsdale, NY, May 1, 1929, in Scarsdale. They had three sons: James Lawrence Dunham Edsall (known always as Lawrence), June 6, 1930 - July 8, 1978; David T. Edsall, born 1933, and Nicholas C. Edsall, born 1936.  Margaret D. Edsall was born in New York, NY, June 9, 1902, and died May 19, 1987.  They lived most of their married life in Cambridge, MA.

References

External links
Harvard University Gazette tribute to Edsall
www.harvardsquarelibrary.org/cfs2/john_edsall.php
National Academy of Sciences Biographical Memoir

American biochemists
American molecular biologists
Harvard University faculty
1902 births
2002 deaths
Harvard College alumni
Scientists from Philadelphia
Journal of Biological Chemistry editors
Members of the Royal Swedish Academy of Sciences
Members of the American Philosophical Society